USS YMS-477 was a  built for the United States Navy during World War II. The vessel was launched on 6 November and completed four days later. USS YMS-477 was commissioned soon after under the command of Lieutenant (junior grade) Russell V. Malo, USNR.

After wartime service, YMS-477 was decommissioned and then struck from the Naval Vessel Register on 28 August 1946. In April 1947, the former minesweeper was sold, but her ultimate fate is unknown.

References 
 

 

PCS-1376-class minesweepers
YMS-1-class minesweepers of the United States Navy
Ships built by Tacoma Boatbuilding Company
1943 ships
World War II minesweepers of the United States